German singer Helene Fischer has released nine studio albums, seven live albums, four compilation albums and 33 singles.

Albums

Studio albums

Compilation albums

Live albums

Singles

Other charted songs

Guest appearances

Videography

Video albums

Music videos

Television

References

External links
 Helene Fischer discography at Helene-Fischer.de

Discographies of German artists
Schlager music discographies